Tabarian (also Romanized as Tabarīān; also known as Tabarān-e Pā’īn and Tāzeh Qal‘eh) is a village in Golian Rural District, in the Central District of Shirvan County, North Khorasan Province, Iran. At the 2006 census, its population was 282, in 64 families.

References 

Populated places in Shirvan County